The DB Class V 162 (after 1968 named DB Class 217) is a class of four-axle diesel hydraulic locomotive built as a development of the DB Class V 160 for the Deutsche Bundesbahn from 1965 to 1968.

This variant has a separate diesel engine providing auxiliary power and for electric train heating, replacing the steam generator in the original V 160.

The locomotives continued to be used after the formation of the Deutsche Bahn AG in 1994; the final DB Schenker unit was withdrawn in December 1997.

Two of the prototypes of the class operated as internal locomotives and were for a time classified as DB Class 753.

Background 

In the early 1960s, the then German Federal Railways (Deutsche Bundesbahn or DB) and the German railway industry developed the V 160 series (with which this class shares the majority of its design features), a diesel locomotive for use on medium-duty passenger and freight trains on main and secondary lines. These locomotives had steam heating apparatus for passenger coaches, but could not power electrically heated stock. Therefore, with the increasing use in the future of electrically heated coaches, co-commitment with the increasing electrification of the system it was necessary to produce a variant with a method of electrical power generation.

Design and production

Prototypes 
In 1963, Krupp AG was requested to develop a V160 variant with electric train heating which would have the classification code V 162. In 1965 two prototypes V 162 001 and V 162 002 were produced, and a third V 162 003 made in 1966.

Each had a MTU-built (then Maybach) 16-cylinder engine of the type 16V652 TB10 producing  which was entirely used for traction. Since in the mid-1960s a more powerful engine was not available, the electrical supply was powered by an auxiliary diesel engine. The inclusion of two engines in turn meant that the overall length of the machine was increased by 0.4 m in comparison to the V 160, making a total length over buffers of 16.4 meters.

The auxiliary engine used by Krupp was a 12-cylinder MAN D3650 HM3U engine developing  of power. Since DB required that the auxiliary power should be available for traction (for use on freight trains), the auxiliary engine was also connected to the transmission, meaning that the traction power could be increased to 1813 kW when necessary. The generators of the three prototypes were from different manufacturers: In the V 162 001 the supplier was BBC, in V 162 002, AEG and in V 162 003 Siemens supplied the electrical generator.

The three prototypes went into testing from 1965 to 1968, resulting in the Siemens generator (generating 310 kW for electrical heating) being chosen for the main production tranche.

Production locomotives 

As the prototypes had proved successful, in 1967 construction of twelve locomotives began at Krupp. Since a new numbering scheme was introduced in 1968, the locomotives were given the numbers 217 011 to 217 022 (the prototypes being renumbered to 217 001 to 217 003).

In 1971, disc brakes were fitted to the locomotives (replacing the block brakes) leading to more effective braking and a consequential increase in the maximum operating speed limit by 20 km/h to 140 km/h.

Even though it was foreseeable that more of this class of locomotives could be built, in 1968 the first representatives of the Class 218 were built with a single diesel engine (of 2500 hp) providing traction and electrical heating power in one unit. Thus no more of this variant were made, since the single-engined variant presented a clear reduction in maintenance costs.

These vehicles had a distinctive exhaust system (with scoop like protuberances on the roof) fitted in 1993.

DB Class 753 

In April 1989, the prototype locomotives 217 001 and 217 002 were transferred to work internal DB traffic; as such they were reclassified as 753 001 and 753 002. Both had, since 1974, often been used for test and measurement trains and in the testing of other locomotives as 'engine brakes'; the reclassification in 1989 was therefore purely formal. As part of the reclassification, rebuilding of these machines took place, including fitting of hydrodynamic brakes.

In the late 2000s, the two were reclassified back as Class 217s and returned to freight duties.

Operational history and modifications 

At the end of 1970 and the beginning of 1971, the three prototypes set out from Mühldorf to the DB railway works in Regensburg, where six of the production locomotives were also stationed. By 1972 all 15 of the class were concentrated in Regensburg. They were used for pulling heavy freight trains on the lines Regensburg - Schwandorf - Nuremberg - Sulzbach-Rosenberg - Schwandorf - Furth im Wald.

In 1993, the Class 217 locomotives were put into trial use with double-decker passenger coaches on the line connecting Mühldorf and Munich. This deployment lasted just two days, with the result that Class 218 locomotives were used on the double decker trains and the Class 217s returned to Regensburg.

In 1998, the bahnreform of the Deutsche Bahn led to its division into different subsidiaries: the class were assigned to freight division and thus became the property of DB Cargo (since September 2003 renamed Railion Germany, and currently DB Schenker).

In May 2000, all of the units (except DB 217 001) were assigned back to the engine shed at Mühldorf. They pull freight trains around their base in Mühldorf - destinations being Munich, Simbach, Landshut, Freilassing and the Wacker plant at Burghausen, often in multiple workings.

The last 217 (217 017) in use by DB Schenker was withdrawn on 19 December 2011 at Mühldorf Depot and it has been replaced by Euro 66 locomotives. There is a Class 217 (nr 217 014-0) on display at the DB Museum, Koblenz.

See also 
DB Class V 160 family Overview of all related classes

References and notes

Sources 
v160.de V 160 family site - brief introduction, detailed individual locomotive information, including historical photographs, builder, current status and work histories. Also more technical information on engine, transmission, fuel system and cab. v160.de
Die homepage der Baureihe 217 History, Class 217 specific technical information, fleet list, information on Class 753, and other information.

V 162
B-B locomotives
Krupp locomotives
Railway locomotives introduced in 1965
Diesel-hydraulic locomotives of Germany
Standard gauge locomotives of Germany